The Georgian shemaya (Alburnus derjugini)  is a species of cyprinid fish in the genus Alburnus. It is found in eastern Black Sea tributaries, from south of the Caucasus in Russia and Georgia, south to the Çoruh River in eastern Anatolia, Turkey and west to the Sakarya River.

The species name commemorates the collector Konstantin Deryugin.

References

Alburnus
Fish described in 1923
Taxa named by Lev Berg